The Philippine Tennis Association (PhilTA) is the national governing body for tennis in the Philippines.

Suspension
The International Tennis Federation imposed a two-year suspension against PhilTA in late 2020 due to a leadership crisis within the federation failing to tackle its "exclusive membership base".

See also
Philippines Davis Cup team
Philippines Fed Cup team

References

External links
Philippine Tennis Association profile at the Philippine Olympic Committee website

National members of the Asian Tennis Federation
 
Tennis